Santiago Calatayud, O.S.A. or Giacomo da Calatayud (died 1526) was a Roman Catholic prelate who served as Bishop of Santorini (1521–1526).

Biography
Santiago Calatayud was ordained a priest in the Order of Saint Augustine.
On 20 Feb 1521, he was appointed during the papacy of Pope Leo X as Bishop of Santorini.
He served as Bishop of Santorini until his death in 1526.

References 

16th-century Roman Catholic bishops in the Republic of Venice
Bishops appointed by Pope Leo X
1526 deaths